State University of Yogyakarta (abbreviated as UNY) is a state university established in the Special Region of Yogyakarta, Indonesia in 1964.

History 
State University of Yogyakarta (formerly IKIP Yogyakarta or Yogyakarta Institute of Teacher Education and Educational Sciences) was founded on May 21, 1964. IKIP Yogyakarta was a merger of two educational institutions: the Faculty of Pedagogy of Gadjah Mada University and the Institute of Teacher Education. They offered study programs of education sciences and teacher education. The merger was mandated by the Presidential Decree of the Republic of Indonesia, Number I/1963.

On August 4, 1999, the President of the Republic of Indonesia, by Presidential Decree No. 93/1999, officially declared that IKIP Yogyakarta was converted into the State University of Yogyakarta (abbreviated as SUY). It expanded the institution's mandate to offer other programs. The conversion of IKIP Yogyakarta from a specialized training institution into a comprehensive university was based on some considerations. One of them is the observation that the organizational structure of an educational institution was insufficient to support scientific development and that the number of graduates of IKIP Yogyakarta who entered non-teaching fields also increased. In carrying out the wider mandate, SUY initially offered 12 non-education study programs at the bachelor level and three-year undergraduate diploma levels in the following faculties: the Faculty of Languages and Arts Education, the Faculty of Mathematics and Natural Sciences Education, and the Faculty of Engineering and Vocational Education. The non-education study programs include those offered in the Faculty of Sport Sciences and the Faculty of Economics.

To meet societal demands, in 2011 the Faculty of Social Sciences and Economics was divided into two separate faculties: the Faculty of Social Sciences and the Faculty of Economics. This was mandated through the Ministerial Decree No. 23/2011 about the Organization and Governance of SUY signed on 22 June 2011. SUY then has seven faculties.

As has been mentioned above, IKIP Yogyakarta was converted into SUY on August 4, 1999. However, the anniversary of IKIP Yogyakarta remains SUY's anniversary, i.e., May 21.

Faculties
There are seven faculties:
 Faculty of Education Sciences 
 Faculty of Mathematics and Natural Sciences 
 Faculty of Language and Arts 
 Faculty of Engineering 
 Faculty of Social Science 
 Faculty of Sport Science 
 Faculty of Economics 

UNY also has many postgraduate programs :
 Master Programs and Doctoral Programs

Facts and figures
In 2013, the profile was as follows:

1 graduate school
64 undergraduate programs (53 bachelor's and 11 three-year-diploma)
 16 graduate study programs (11 master's and 5 doctoral)
28,515 undergraduate students (as of November 2013)
1,850 diploma students (as of November 2013)
2,175 graduate students (as of November 2013)
 85 international students (as of November 2013)
76,467 alumni
1,147 faculty members (professors: 59, doctoral degree holders: 207, master's degree holders: 754 and bachelor's degree holders: 66) (as of September 2013)
980 staff (as of April 2013)
5,831 accepted applications out of 97,033 applications submitted in 2013

Scholarships for foreign students 
 Darmasiswa RI Scholarship Program http://darmasiswa.kemdiknas.go.id/v2/)
 Developing Countries Partnership Scholarship http://knb.dikti.go.id/index.php)

Research and library 
1025 research studies from 2010 to 2012, 9 (7 national and 2 international) research studies obtaining intellectual property rights in 2012, 261,802 books in SUY's central library consisting of public works, philosophy, psychology, religion, social sciences, languages, fundamental sciences, applied sciences & technology, arts & sports, literature, and history & geography (as of April 2013)
 A provided access to online publications such as journals and newsletters
 A library in each faculty and school at SUY

Institute of research and community service
The Institute of Research and Community Service (IRCS) runs nine research and development centers:

Center for Early Childhood and Elderly Studies
 Center for Cultural, Regional, and Environmental Research
Center for Educational Policy and Evaluation
Center for Primary, Secondary, and Vocational Education Research
Center for Gender and Women's Studies
Center for Creativity and Sport Development
Center for Research Implementation and Protection of Intellectual Property Rights
Center for Entrepreneurship Development
Center for Community Service Management and Integrated Regional Development

IEDQA 
The Institute of Educational Development and Quality Assurance (IEDQA)  is one of main structures at State University of Yogyakarta. IEDQA conducts several programs such as planning, implementing, as well as monitoring and evaluating educational development, quality assurance, and professional development. It has nine centers:

Center for Quality Assurance
Center for Curriculum, Instructional, and Learning Resources
 Center for Field Teaching Practicum and Fieldwork Practicum
 Center for Teaching, Non-Teaching, and Non-Educational Professions
 Center for University Level Subjects
 Center for Language Studies
 Center for Character Education and Culture Development
 Center for Career Development
 Center for Scientific Publications Development

Rectors
 Prof. Dr. Johar, MS. (1991 - 1999)
 Prof. Suyanto, Ph.D. (1999 - 2006)
 Prof. Sugeng Mardiyono, Ph.D. (2006 - 2008)
 Prof. Dr. Rochmat Wahab, M.Pd., M.A. (2008 - 2017)
 Prof. Dr. Sutrisna Wibawa, M.Pd (2017-2021)
 Prof. Dr. Sumaryanto, M.Kes. (2021-)

Notable alumni 
 Putu Gede Juni Antara, association football player
 Hanung Bramantyo, film director
 Septian David, association football player
 Evan Dimas, association football player
 Hansamu Yama, association football player

Gallery

References

Educational institutions established in 1964
Yogyakarta State University
Sleman Regency
1964 establishments in Indonesia